Abraham McClellan (October 4, 1789 – May 3, 1866) was an American politician that represented Tennessee's 2nd district in the United States House of Representatives from 1837 to 1843.  He also served several terms in the Tennessee House of Representatives and the Tennessee Senate, commanded a militia company during the Seminole Wars (1836–1837). He was a slaveholder.

Biography

Early life
McClellan was born at "White Top" in Sullivan County, Tennessee, on October 4, 1789. He attended the common schools, graduated from Washington College near Greeneville, Tennessee, and engaged in agricultural pursuits.

Career
He was a member of the Tennessee House of Representatives from 1823 to 1825 and from 1827 to 1829. He served in the Tennessee Senate from 1829 to 1833. He was a member of the convention to revise the Tennessee State Constitution in 1834.  McClellan served as captain of the Second Regiment, Second Brigade, Tennessee Mounted Volunteer Militia during the Seminole Wars, from 1836 to 1837.

In 1837, McClellan, a Democrat, defeated incumbent Samuel Bunch, 3,228 votes to 2,741, in the election for the 2nd district seat in the U.S. House of Representatives.  He was easily reelected in 1839, and brushed off a challenge from rising Whig politician William T. Senter in 1841. McClellan served in the Twenty-fifth, Twenty-sixth, and Twenty-seventh congresses, from March 4, 1837, to March 3, 1843.

In 1843, his home county, Sullivan, was redistricted to the 1st district.  This was part of an effort initiated by rising politician Andrew Johnson, who planned to run for the 1st district seat, and wanted to ensure the new district's boundaries were favorable to Democrats.  The state legislature also wanted to get rid of the 1st district's fiery incumbent, Thomas D. Arnold.  Realizing he had little chance of winning the nomination over Johnson, McClellan chose not to seek a fourth term.

After leaving Congress, he resumed agricultural pursuits and died at his home, "White Top," in Sullivan County on May 3, 1866. He was interred in Weaver Cemetery near Bristol, Tennessee.

References

1789 births
1866 deaths
Democratic Party members of the Tennessee House of Representatives
Democratic Party Tennessee state senators
American people of the Seminole Wars
People from Sullivan County, Tennessee
Democratic Party members of the United States House of Representatives from Tennessee
19th-century American politicians